Nishijapon (After the Night... Dawn) (2005) is a Bengali film directed by Sandip Ray, based on a novel of the same name by Narayan Gangopadhyay.

Synopsis 
Bimal (Soumitra Chatterjee) is visited by his family and his friend in his Darjeeling house. Anita (Rituparna Sengupta), his elder son Nirmal's wife, takes good care of them, spending most of her time in the kitchen. Brojen (Deepankar De), the managing director of a tea estate and Bimal's friend, irritates everyone, especially Nirmal (Sabyasachi Chakrabarty), with his stories of his guru's miracles and his over-enthusiasm for food. Anita keeps trying to convince Shyamal (Parambrata Chatterjee), her brother-in-law and Sunita (Raima Sen), to see each other. Shyamal and Sunita grow to like each other and Anita enthusiastically declares the alliance to Bimal. Meanwhile, torrential rain makes it impossible for Ram, the servant, to get much food from the nearly closed market. That night the rain stops. Suddenly, all the inmates of the house are jolted out of their sleeps by a terrible earthquake. Power is cut off and most of the things inside the house are broken. Nirmal goes out to discover that Ram's house and orchard have been destroyed in a landslide. The next morning they discover that the wooden bridge which connected them to the world was lying broken. Soon, there is serious shortage of food. Tempers flare as Nirmal and Brojen have a wild argument. Nirmal tries to climb down the mountain to get help, slips and injures himself but saved by Shyamal. Meanwhile, Brojen starts to have optical illusions. He demands more food, which leaves Anita fasting. Nirmal is infuriated by the gesture of Brojen and insults him for being insensitive and an uninvited guest who is a burden to them in this hour of crisis. Anita becomes weak and even faints. Shyamal tries to climb down the mountain alone, but his nerves fail when he sees a dead body stuck in the rocks. He sees Anita drink the water washing a milk powder packet. Nirmal shouts at Brojen insulting him sorely. Anita and Shyamal try to control him but fail. Anita cries out in anger to reveal the truth behind their apparently happy marriage. Brojen, driven nearly insane by hunger, tries to walk out during the night. Shyamal has to knock him unconscious to bring him back to his room. Sunita feeds her share of rice to Anita who tells her not to trust anyone, Brojen on Shyamal. Bimal contemplates suicide with sleeping pills. Everyone is shocked out of their respective stupors by the sounds of gunshots. Nirmal shoots birds in the hope of roasting them. When Shyamal tries to stop him, he points the gun at him, saying that soon the only way out would be cannibalism. A shocked and desperate Shyamal begins to try to climb down the mountain again with the horrified Sunita watching. At this moment, relief comes, making arrangements for the family's rescue, bringing hope to all.

Cast 
Sabyasachi Chakrabarty  - Nirmal Das
Soumitra Chatterjee - Bimal Das
Deepankar De - Brojen Lahiri
Rituparna Sengupta - Anita Das
Raima Sen - Sunita
Parambrata Chatterjee - Shyamal Das

Awards
BFJA Awards  (2006)
Best Screenplay-Sandip Ray
BFJA - Most Promising Actor Award- Parambrato Chattopadhyay
BFJA - Most Promising Actress Award- Raima Sen

References

External links

www.telegraphindia.com A Ray for a Ray; so what?s new?

2005 films
2000s Bengali-language films
Bengali-language Indian films
Films directed by Sandip Ray
Films based on works by Narayan Gangopadhyay